Ataur Rahman was a freedom fighter of the Liberation war of Bangladesh in 1971, a Jatiya Samajtantrik Dal-JSD politician and the former Member of Parliament of Sirajganj-3.

Career
Ataur Rahman was elected to parliament from Sirajganj-3 in 1988.

References

Jatiya Samajtantrik Dal-JSD politicians
4th Jatiya Sangsad members
1951 births
20th-century Bengalis
21st-century Bengalis
People from Sirajganj District
2017 deaths